Mono Lake Tufa State Natural Reserve is located near Yosemite National Park within Mono County, in eastern California. It was established in 1981 by the California State Legislature to preserve the natural limestone "tufa tower" formations at Mono Lake.

Access
California State Park Rangers were charged with conducting interpretive talks and tours along the shores of Mono Lake, as well as protecting the resources.  In 1984 the Federal Government designated surrounding lands as the Mono Basin National Scenic Area. Since that time visitor services have been offered as a cooperative effort between these two agencies, as well as the Mono Lake Committee.

See also
Mono-Inyo Craters
Bishop Tuff

References

External links

Mono Lake Tufa State Natural Reserve website
Mono Basin National Forest Scenic Area website
Mono Lake Scenic Area Visitor Center
CA.Parks: Mono Lake tufa tower images

California State Reserves
Tufa
Tufa
Inyo National Forest
Landforms of Mono County, California
Protected areas of Mono County, California
Protected areas of the Sierra Nevada (United States)
1981 establishments in California
Protected areas established in 1981